Saddle Tramp is the seventh studio album by Charlie Daniels and the fourth as the Charlie Daniels Band, released on March 29, 1976. The album was certified Gold by the RIAA on September 4, 1981.

Track listing 
All songs composed by the Charlie Daniels Band (Charlie Daniels, Tom Crain, Taz DiGregorio, Fred Edwards, Charles Hayward & Don Murray), except where indicated:

Side one
 "Dixie on My Mind" - 2:38
 "Saddle Tramp" - 11:00
 "Sweet Louisiana" (Daniels) - 4:41

Side two
 "Wichita Jail" (Daniels) - 2:50
 "Cumberland Mountain Number Nine" (Crain) - 4:46
 "It's My Life" - 6:08
 "Sweetwater, Texas" (Daniels) - 5:36

Personnel
The Charlie Daniels Band:
 Charlie Daniels – guitar, fiddle, vocals
 Taz DiGregorio – keyboard, vocals
 Tom Crain – guitar, vocals
 Charlie Hayward – bass
 Don Murray – drums
 Fred Edwards – drums

Additional musicians:
 Toy Caldwell – steel guitar (tracks: B4)
 Jai Johanny Johanson – congas (tracks: A2)

Production personnel:
 Kurt Kinzel – engineer
 Richard Schoff – assistant engineer
 Don Rubin – executive producer
 George Marino – mastering
 Paul Hornsby – producer
 Joseph E. Sullivan – production supervisor

Chart performance

Album

Singles

Certifications

References

1976 albums
Charlie Daniels albums
Albums produced by Paul Hornsby
Epic Records albums